Les Feuilles d'Automne is a collection of poems written by Victor Hugo, and published in 1831. It contains a multitude of poems, six of which are especially known as Soleils Couchants.

Extracts 
 (This century was two years old)

 (The sun set tonight in the clouds)

Poems 
The collection Les Feuilles d'automne contains the following poems:
 À M. de Lamartine.
 À mes amis L. B. et S.-B.
 Melermemeler Esperanza
 Amis, un dernier mot.
 À Madame Marie M.
 À monsieur Fontaney.
 À ***, trappiste à La Meilleraye.
 À une femme.
 A un voyageur.
 Avant que mes chansons aimées.
 Bièvre.
 Ce qu'on entend sur la montagne.
 Ce siècle avait deux ans.
 Contempler dans son bain sans voiles.
 Banlieue ouest
 Dédain.
 Dicté en présence du glacier du Rhône.
 Laissez. – Tous ces enfants sont bien là.
 La pente de la rêverie.
 La prière pour tous.
 La prière pour tous (II).
 La prière pour tous (III).
 La prière pour tous (IV).
 La prière pour tous (V).
 La prière pour tous (VI).
 La prière pour tous (VII).
 La prière pour tous (VIII).
 La prière pour tous (IX).
 La prière pour tous (X).
 Lorsque l'enfant paraît.
 Madame, autour de vous tant de grâce étincelle.
 Oh ! pourquoi te cacher ?.
 Oh ! qui que vous soyez, jeune ou vieux.
 Ô mes lettres d'amour.
 O toi qui si longtemps.
 Où est donc le bonheur ?.
 Pan.
 Parfois, lorsque tout dort.
 Pour les pauvres.
 Quand le livre où s'endort chaque soir ma pensée.
 Que t'importe, mon cœur.
 Rêverie d'un passant à propos d'un roi
 Soleils couchants.
 Soleils couchants (II).
 Soleils couchants (III).
 Soleils couchants (IV).
 Soleils couchants (V).
 Soleils couchants (VI).
 Souvenir d'enfance.
 Un jour au mont Atlas.
 Un jour vient où soudain l'artiste généreux.
 Vois, cette branche est rude, elle est noire.

References 

1831 books
Poetry by Victor Hugo
French poetry collections
19th-century poetry books